Ten Days to Tulara is a 1958 American Western film directed by George Sherman and starring Sterling Hayden, Grace Raynor and Rodolfo Hoyos, Jr..

Plot
Tramp pilot Scott McBride goes to meet a Mr. Rodriguez who has a mission for him in the South American jungle. He turns out to be Cesar, Scotty's old enemy, who demands that Scotty fly him and his henchmen, on the lam on a robbery and murder charge, to a waiting ship on the other side of the continent.

Cast
 Sterling Hayden as Scotty
 Grace Raynor as Teresa
 Rodolfo Hoyos, Jr. as Cesar
 Carlos Múzquiz as Dario
 Tony Carbajal as Francisco (as Tony Carvajal)
 Juan García as Piranha
 Rafael Alcayde as Mexican colonel 
 Félix González as Marco

See also
 List of American films of 1958

References

External links
 
 
 

1958 films
1950s English-language films
United Artists films
American Western (genre) films
1958 Western (genre) films
Films directed by George Sherman
Films shot in Mexico
1950s American films